Mista may refer to

People
 Mista (footballer) (born 1978), Spanish footballer
 Mista Savona, reggae, dancehall and hip-hop producer
 Mista Silva, British-Ghanaian musician
Aleksander Miśta (born 1983), Polish chess player

Other uses
 Mista (band), an American R&B group featuring Bobby Valentino
 Mista (album), the 1996 debut album by the group
 Mista Mo, host of the Canadian TV series Buzz
 Mista (dance), a Croatian folk dance
 Guido Mista, a side protagonist from JoJo's Bizarre Adventure: Golden Wind

See also
 
"Mista Mista", a song by the Fugees from their 1996 album The Score
 Mister (disambiguation)